Mateus da Silva Vital Assumpção (born 12 February 1998), known as Mateus Vital, is a Brazilian professional footballer who plays as an attacking midfielder for Cruzeiro. He is a former Brazil U23 member.

Career

Corinthians

Vital started his career in CR Vasco da Gama and was sold to Corinthians for €2 million in 2018. In 2018, Corinthians won its 29th Paulista Championship. Vital was a vital member in the victorious campaign scoring in the penalty shootout against São Paulo FC in the second leg of the semi-final and bagging an assist in the second leg of the final against arch-rivals Palmeiras.

Loan to Panathinaikos

On August 25, 2021, Corinthians announced an agreement with Panathinaikos for the one-year loan of the 23-year-old midfielder, with a purchase option that was estimated by Brazilian media to reach €4 million for 50% of Vital's rights. Vital made an impressive debut for the club but he wasn't able to maintain his good form and he eventually lost his place in the starting 11.

Career statistics

Honours
Corinthians
 Campeonato Paulista: 2018, 2019

Panathinaikos
 Greek Cup: 2021–22

References

1998 births
Living people
Brazilian footballers
Association football midfielders
CR Vasco da Gama players
Sport Club Corinthians Paulista players
Panathinaikos F.C. players
Cruzeiro Esporte Clube players
Campeonato Brasileiro Série A players
Campeonato Brasileiro Série B players
Super League Greece players
Brazilian expatriate sportspeople in Greece
Expatriate footballers in Greece
Footballers from Rio de Janeiro (city)